Coleophora cnossiaca is a moth of the family Coleophoridae. It is found on Crete.

References

cnossiaca
Moths described in 1983
Moths of Europe